The 1972–73 season was Galatasaray's 69th in existence and the 15th consecutive season in the 1. Lig. This article shows statistics of the club's players in the season, and also lists all matches that the club have played in the season.

Squad statistics

Players in / out

In

Out

1.Lig

Standings

Matches

Türkiye Kupası
Kick-off listed in local time (EET)

1st round

2nd round

1/4 final

1/2 final

Final

Süper Kupa
Kick-off listed in local time (EET)

European Cup

1st round

Friendly matches

TSYD Kupası

Zafer Bayramı Kupası

Hasan Tahsin Kupası

Attendance

References

 Tuncay, Bülent (2002). Galatasaray Tarihi. Yapı Kredi Yayınları

External links
 Galatasaray Sports Club Official Website 
 Turkish Football Federation – Galatasaray A.Ş. 
 uefa.com – Galatasaray AŞ

Galatasaray S.K. (football) seasons
Turkish football clubs 1972–73 season
Turkish football championship-winning seasons
1970s in Istanbul